The Kaiser class of ironclad warships was a pair of vessels built for the German Imperial Navy in the early 1870s. The lead ship, was laid down in 1871 and launched in 1874.  was laid down in 1872 and launched in 1874; both ships were built by the Samuda Brothers shipyard in London. They were the last German capital ships built by a foreign shipyard.

Both ships served with the fleet following their commissioning in 1875, though they spent a significant part of their career in reserve, as Germany maintained only a small number of ships on active duty for training cruises in the period. The ships were substantially rebuilt in the 1890s into armored cruisers and stationed in Asia for three years. Kaiser was the flagship of Otto von Diederichs's East Asia Squadron during the Kiautschou Bay concession seizure in November 1897. Following their return to Germany in 1899–1900, the ships were used in several secondary roles, including as harbor and barracks ships. The ships were stricken from the naval register in 1906; Deutschland was used as a target ship before being sold for scrap in 1908, though Kaiser served on as a floating barracks until she was sold in 1920.

Design 
In 1867, the new North German  (Imperial Diet) approved a fleet plan that called for a fleet of sixteen ironclad warships (along with a number of other warships) by 1877. The ironclad fleet was intended to serve as a coastal defense force to prevent another blockade of German ports as had been conducted by the Danish Navy during the Second Schleswig War in 1864. By the end of the decade, nine ships had either been purchased abroad or laid down in German shipyards. Two more ships, which would become the Kaiser class, were authorized and ordered from Britain. The design for these vessels was prepared in 1869 by Edward Reed, though work was delayed until 1871. General Albrecht von Stosch, who had by 1872 become the chief of the Imperial Admiralty, objected to the use of a British shipbuilder, preferring to use the contracts to encourage domestic shipbuilding. As a result, they proved to be the last German capital ships built abroad.

Reed designed the vessels as casemate ships, mounting a smaller battery of guns, albeit of a larger caliber, compared to traditional broadside ironclads. The casemate arrangement was more flexible than the broadside, as guns could be moved between different firing ports, and since the casemate was sponsoned out over the hull, the guns could be directed forward and aft. Upon completion in 1875, the two vessels were regarded by foreign navies as the most powerful vessels of the type, though they were by then obsolescent compared to the latest turret ships being built.

General characteristics 

At the designed displacement, the vessels displaced . When the vessels were fully loaded, they displaced . Their hulls were built with transverse bulkheads and double longitudinal iron frames; iron plating covered teak backing. The ships had nine watertight compartments and a double bottom that ran for 59 percent of the hull length.

The German navy regarded the ships as good sea boats, very sensitive to commands from the helm, and with a gentle motion. The ships had a moderate turning radius and were very stable. Their standard complement consisted of 32 officers and 568 enlisted men, and while serving as a squadron flagship, this could be augmented by an additional nine officers and 47 sailors. When serving as the second flagship, the crew  was increased by six officers and 35 enlisted men. After their reconstruction in the 1890s, the ships' crews were significantly increased, to 36 officers and 620 enlisted men. The size of the command staffs grew as well, to 11 officers and 57 enlisted for the squadron flagship and nine officers and 48 men for the second flagship. The ships carried a number of smaller boats, including one picket boat, two launches, one pinnace, two cutters, two yawls, and two dinghies.

The two ships were powered by a two-cylinder single-expansion steam engine built by John Penn and Sons of Greenwich. The engines were supplied with steam by eight coal-fired trunk boilers, which were also provided by J Penn & Sons. The eight boilers were trunked into two large, retractable funnels. Three generators provided 30 kilowatts of electrical power.

Armament and armor 

The Kaiser-class ships were armed with a main battery of eight  L/20 guns mounted in a central armored casemate amidships. These guns were supplied with 768 rounds of ammunition. As built, the ships were also equipped with one  L/22 gun.

Between 1891–1897, Kaiser and Deutschland were rebuilt and their armament was significantly altered. Kaiser was equipped with one  L/30 gun, six  SK L/30 quick-firing guns, and nine  SK L/30 quick-firing guns, while eight 15 cm L/30 and eight 8.8 cm SK L/30 guns were installed on Deutschland. Four  auto-cannon were added as well. Both ships also had five  torpedo tubes added: Deutschlands tubes were installed in the hull, underwater, while Kaisers tubes were placed above water. Both ships had a stock of 13 torpedoes.

The ships' armor was made of wrought iron and backed with teak.

Ships

Service history 

After their commissioning in 1875, both ships served with the fleet. They formed half of a squadron sent to the Mediterranean Sea in 1877 in response to unrest in the Ottoman Empire related to the Russo-Turkish War; the violence threatened German citizens living there. The squadron, under the command of Rear Admiral Carl Ferdinand Batsch, steamed to the ports of Haifa and Jaffa in July 1877, but found no significant tensions ashore. Batsch then departed and cruised the Mediterranean for the remainder of the summer, returning to Germany in October.

Kaiser and Deutschland were placed in reserve after the 1878 maneuvers were cancelled and remained there for a decade, with the exception of the 1883 maneuvers. During the maneuvers, both ships' steam engines proved troublesome, and indeed forced a temporary halt to the training exercises when they simultaneously broke down. The two ships were reactivated in 1889 to participate in cruises following the coronation of Kaiser Wilhelm II. These included a state visit to Great Britain in August 1889 and a tour of the Mediterranean in the winter of 1889–1890.

Between 1891 and 1897, the two ships were heavily rebuilt as armored cruisers. They were significantly rearmed with a large number of medium and smaller caliber guns. Kaiser served in Asian waters from 1897 to 1899, while her sister was on the Asia station from 1898 to 1900. Admiral Otto von Diederichs, then the commander of the East Asia Squadron, used Kaiser for his flagship. The ship was involved in the Kiautschou Bay concession seizure in November 1897 and was later deployed to protect German interests in the Philippines during the Spanish–American War in 1898.

Kaiser and Deutschland were reduced to harbor ships on 3 May 1904. Kaiser was renamed Uranus on 12 October 1905 and Deutschland became Jupiter on 22 November of that year. The Kaiserliche Marine sold Deutschland in 1908 for 120,000 marks; she was broken up for scrap the following year in Hamburg-Moorburg. Kaiser was ultimately broken up in 1920 in Harburg.

Footnotes

Notes

Citations

References 

 

 
 

Frigate classes